Narrowing may refer to:
Narrowing (computer science), a type of algorithm for solving equations between symbolic expressions
Narrowing of algebraic value sets, a method for the elimination of values from a solution set which are inconsistent with the equations being solved
Narrowing (historical linguistics), a type of semantic change
Collisional narrowing of a spectral line due to collisions of the emitting species
Motional narrowing of a resonant frequency due to the inhomogeneity of the system averaging out over time
Perceptual narrowing, a process in brain development
Q-based narrowing, a concept in pragmatics
Stenosis, the narrowing of a blood vessel or other tubular organ

See also
Narrow (disambiguation)